The Burnt Coat Harbor Light Station is a lighthouse on Swan's Island, Maine.  It is located on Hockamock Head, at the entrance to Burnt Coat Harbor and at the end of Harbor Road.  Hockamock Head is a peninsula extending south from the center of the island, dividing the island's main harbor from Toothacker Bay.  The light marks the entrance to Burnt Coat Harbor.  It was built in 1872, and is a well-preserved 19th-century light station.  It was listed on the National Register of Historic Places in 1988.

Description and history
The tower is a square brick structure  in height, with a ten-sided lantern chamber surrounded by an iron walkway with railing. It is capped by a round ventilator. The keeper's house is an L-shaped wood-frame structure, finished in white clapboards. Just to the south of the tower stands the small clapboard bell house, a roughly square structure (it is slightly tapered), with a gable roof and doorway at one end. The oil house is a small brick structure with a doorway at one gabled end, and a small ventilator on the roof.

The station was authorized in 1871, and the tower and keeper's house were completed the following year.  The station originally had a second range light, placed at the site of the bell house, with a covered way connecting the two towers.  That tower and the covered way were removed in 1884.  The bell house was built in 1911, and the oil house in 1895.  The station was automated in 1975.  The keeper's house is now maintained by the Town of Swan's Island, with financial assistance from Friends of the Swan's Island Lighthouse. The keeper's house is open in the summer with a historical exhibit and a small art gallery.  The tower is also open for climbing several days per week.  Further information, including a detailed history, live webcams from the tower, and recommendations on visiting the lighthouse, can be found at www.burncoatharborlight.com.

See also
National Register of Historic Places listings in Hancock County, Maine

References

Lighthouses completed in 1872
Lighthouses on the National Register of Historic Places in Maine
Lighthouses in Hancock County, Maine
Museums in Hancock County, Maine
Lighthouse museums in Maine
Historic districts on the National Register of Historic Places in Maine
National Register of Historic Places in Hancock County, Maine